The football tournament at the 2017 Central American Games is scheduled to take place in December 2017.

The tournament will act as a qualifying tournament for the Central American nations for the 2018 Central American and Caribbean Games. Three teams will qualify from the men's tournament, two teams will qualify from the women's tournament.

The men's tournament will be restricted to those born after 1 January 1997 and the women's tournament will have no age restrictions.

Teams
In October 2017, CONCACAF wrote to ORDECA to confirm that teams from Guatemala would not be eligible for the competitions due to suspension of the National Football Federation of Guatemala from FIFA. Honduras and Belize did not enter a team into the women's competition.

Men's

Women's

Men's tournament

Squads

Group stage

Tiebreakers
The teams are ranked according to points (3 points for a win, 1 point for a draw, 0 points for a loss). If tied on points, tiebreakers are applied in the following order:
Greater number of goals between teams
Number of goals scored in group
Goal difference in group
Number of goals scored across all groups
Drawing of lots

Group A

Group B

Knockout stage

Semi-finals

Third-place playoff

Final

Women's tournament

Squads

Group stage

Knockout stage

Semi-finals

Third-place playoff

Final

Qualified teams for Central American and Caribbean Games
For the men's, the top three teams qualified for the 2018 Central American and Caribbean Games as the UNCAF representatives:

For the women's, the top two teams qualified for the 2018 Central American and Caribbean Games as the UNCAF representatives:

References

External links 

 
2017
International association football competitions hosted by Nicaragua
2017 in Central American football
football
2017–18 in Nicaraguan football